Albert George Sandeman (21 October 1833 – 6 January 1923) was an English businessman and the 100th Governor of the Bank of England.

He was born the eldest of the nine children of George Glas Sandeman, head of the Sandeman wine importing company, and his wife Elizabeth Forster. He entered the family business at the age of 16 and at 20 was sent to work at the Oporto office in Portugal.

He later became a director of the London Dock Company and in 1866 a director of the Bank of England. He was appointed High Sheriff of Surrey for 1872–73.

On his father's death in 1888 he became chairman of the family business of Geo. G. Sandeman & Sons Ltd. In 1894 he was made Deputy Governor of the Bank of England, becoming Governor the following year until 1897. He also served as a Commissioner of Income Tax for the City of London and as President of the London Chamber of Commerce (1898). Sandeman's tenure as Governor occurred during the Panics of 1893 and 1896.

He died in 1923 at his home, "Greylands", in Bexhill, Sussex. He had married Maria Carlota Perpetua de Moraes Sarmento in Portugal in 1895 and with her had at least six children, including at least two sons and four daughters.

References

1833 births
1923 deaths
British merchants
Deputy Governors of the Bank of England
Governors of the Bank of England
High Sheriffs of Surrey